Gheorghe Popovici (born 4 May 1938) is a Romanian wrestler. He competed at the 1960 Summer Olympics and the 1964 Summer Olympics.

References

1938 births
Living people
Romanian male sport wrestlers
Olympic wrestlers of Romania
Wrestlers at the 1960 Summer Olympics
Wrestlers at the 1964 Summer Olympics
Sportspeople from Chișinău
20th-century Romanian people
World Wrestling Championships medalists